Katherine Clifton, 2nd Baroness Clifton (c. 1592 – buried 17 September 1637), was an English-born Scottish peer (later known as the Countess of March, then Duchess of Lennox and then Countess of Abercorn).

Birth and origins
Katherine was born about 1592, in England, as daughter of Gervase Clifton and his wife, Katherine Darcy. Her father was a knight and would become the 1st Baron Clifton of Leighton Bromswold in Huntingdonshire, England. Her mother was the only child and heiress of Sir Henry Darcy. Her parents married in June 1591. Her brother died in 1602 and she became the only surviving child of her parents and heiress of the manor of Leighton Bromswold.

Her father is made a baron by writ
On 9 July 1608 her father was summoned to Parliament by writ, which implicitly elevated him to a baron. Such baronies by writ had a succession in which a daughter could succeed in absence of a son.

First marriage
Katherine Clifton married twice. In 1609, when she was about 17, she married her first husband, Lord Esmé Stewart, a younger son of The 1st Duke of Lennox in Scotland. In 1619, he was created Earl of March.

Catherine and Ésme had eleven children:
 Elizabeth (1610–1674), who married Henry Howard, 22nd Earl of Arundel;
 James (1612–1655), who became the 4th Duke of Lennox;
 Lady Anne Stewart (1614–1646), who married Archibald Douglas, Earl of Angus;
 Henry (1616–1632), who became the 8th Seigneur d'Aubigny;
 Francis (1616–1617);
 Lady Frances (1617–1694), who married Jerome Weston, 2nd Earl of Portland;
 Margaret (1618–1618), who died young;
 George (1618–1642), who became the 9th Seigneur d'Aubigny;
 Ludovic (1619–1665), who became the 10th Seigneur d'Aubigny;
 Lord John (1621–1644); and
 Lord Bernard (1623–1645).

In 1624 his brother, 2nd Duke, died without legitimate heirs, her husband became Duke of Lennox and she became duchess. However, his ducal reign lasted less than a year. He died on  30 July 1624 and was succeeded by their eldest son James.

Father's death and succession
In 1618, when she was about 26, her father died committing suicide from "ennui". Being her father's only surviving child, she inherited her father's title and thus became Baroness Clifton in her own right (suo jure).

Second marriage
In about 1627 she remarried taking as her second husband, The 2nd Earl of Abercorn.

Catherine and James had three children:
 James (c. 1635 – before 1670), was styled Lord Paisley as heir apparent but predeceased his father;
 William (died before 1670), became a colonel and predeceased his father; and
 George (c. 1636 – before 1683), succeeded as the 3rd Earl of Abercorn but died unmarried in Padua.

Excommunication
Her husband was Catholic and she also practised that religion. However, the church of Scotland was Presbyterian and persecuted Catholics. On 3 February 1628, she was excommunicated by the Synod of Paisley.

Death and timeline
She died in 1637 in Scotland. Having been a Catholic, she was buried without ceremony. Her eldest son James succeeded her as Baron Clifton in addition to the titles he inherited from his father.

Notes

References

 – Ab-Adam to Basing (for Abercorn)
 – Canonteign to Cutts (for Clifton)
 

1590s births
1637 deaths
Scottish royalty
Abercorn
Lennox
Hereditary women peers
Katherine
2
Wives of knights